Neottia is a genus of orchids. The genus now includes the former genus Listera,  commonly known as twayblades referring to the single pair of  opposite leaves at the base of the flowering stem. The genus is native to temperate, subarctic and arctic regions across most of Europe, northern Asia (Siberia, China, the Himalayas, Central Asia, etc), and North America, with a few species extending into subtropical regions in the Mediterranean, Indochina, the southeastern United States, etc.

Neottia produces a racemose inflorescences with flowers in shades of green or dull pink through to  maroon and purple. The lip of each flower is prominently forked or two-lobed. Some species (those which were previously the only members of the genus Neottia in the strict sense, such as the bird's-nest orchid, Neottia nidus-avis) are completely without chlorophyll and have leaves which are reduced to scales.

Description
Neottia is a genus of relatively small terrestrial orchids. Some (the former genus Listera) have chlorophyll and are hence gaining their energy from photosynthesis. Others (the formerly narrowly defined genus Neottia) lack chlorophyll and are dependent on fungi for their nutrition (mycotrophic). The flowering stem has a number of greenish or brownish bracts at the base. In the photosynthetic members of the genus there are also two more-or-less opposite green leaves (very rarely more than two in Neottia ovata). The flowers are individually small, in shades of green, yellow, brown or red to purple. The lip is usually much larger than the other five tepals, and is almost always deeply divided into two lobes at the end. The other five tepals may form a loose hood. The pollinia are not stalked.

Taxonomy

At one time the genus was divided between Neottia and Listera. Molecular phylogenetic studies in this century have shown that species lacking chlorophyll, such as Neottia nidus-avis, evolved within a larger clade of photosynthetic plants containing Neottia and Listera, so that the two genera should be combined. As Neottia is the older name, sources such as the World Checklist of Selected Plant Families and the Flora of China now use Neottia for all species formerly in Listera. Other sources continue to divide the genus into two.

Species
Species accepted as of June 2014:

Neottia acuminata Schltr. - China, Japan, Korea, Russian Far East, Himalayas
Neottia alternifolia (King & Pantl.) Szlach. - Sikkim, Yunnan
 Neottia auriculata (Wiegand) Szlach. (syn.  Listera auriculata)  – auricled twayblade - eastern Canada, northeastern USA
Neottia bambusetorum (Hand.-Mazz.) Szlach. - Yunnan
 Neottia banksiana (Lindl.) Rchb.f. in W.G.Walpers (syn.  Listera caurina)  - northwestern twayblade – from Alaska to California
Neottia biflora (Schltr.) Szlach. - Sichuan
 Neottia bifolia (Raf.) Baumbach (syn. Listera australis Lindl.) – southern twayblade - eastern Canada, eastern USA
 Neottia borealis (Morong) Szlach. – northern twayblade - most of Canada including Arctic regions, plus mountains of western US
Neottia brevicaulis (King & Pantl.) Szlach. - eastern Himalayas and Yunnan
Neottia brevilabris Tang & F.T.Wang - Chongqing
Neottia camtschatea (L.) Rchb.f. in H.G.L.Reichenbach - Siberia, Russian Far East, Mongolia, northwestern China, Central Asia
Neottia chandrae Raskoti, J.J.Wood & Ale - Nepal
Neottia chenii S.W.Gale & P.J.Cribb - Sichuan, Gansu
Neottia confusa Bhaumik - Arunachal Pradesh
 Neottia convallarioides (Sw.) Rich. – much of Canada, western and northern US, Komandor Islands of Russia - broad-lipped twayblade
 Neottia cordata (L.) Rich. – widespread across Europe, northern Asia, Canada, US - lesser twayblade, heartleaf twayblade
Neottia dentata (King & Pantl.) Szlach. - Himalayas, Myanmar
Neottia dihangensis Bhaumik  - Arunachal Pradesh
Neottia divaricata (Panigrahi & P.Taylor) Szlach. - Arunachal Pradesh, Tibet
Neottia fangii (Tang & F.T.Wang ex S.C.Chen & G.H.Zhu) S.C.Chen, S.W.Gale & P.J.Cribb - Sichuan
Neottia flabellata (W.W.Sm.) Szlach. - mountains of northern Myanmar
Neottia formosana S.C.Chen, S.W.Gale & P.J.Cribb - Taiwan
Neottia furusei T.Yukawa & Yagame - Japan
Neottia gaudissartii Hand.-Mazz. - Shanxi, Henan, Liaoning
Neottia inagakii Yagame, Katsuy. & T.Yukawa - Honshu
Neottia japonica (Blume) Szlach. - Japan, Ryukyu Islands, Taiwan, Jeju-do Island of Korea
Neottia karoana Szlach. - eastern Himalayas, Yunnan
Neottia kiusiana T.Hashim. & S.Hatus. - Korea, Japan
Neottia kuanshanensis H.J.Su - Taiwan
Neottia latilabra (Evrard ex Gagnep.) ined.. - Vietnam
Neottia listeroides Lindl. in J.F.Royle - mountains from Pakistan to Tibet and Assam
Neottia longicaulis (King & Pantl.) Szlach. - eastern Himalayas, Tibet
Neottia mackinnonii Deva & H.B.Naithani - western Himalayas
Neottia makinoana (Ohwi) Szlach. - Japan
Neottia megalochila S.C.Chen - Sichuan, Yunnan
Neottia meifongensis (H.J.Su & C.Y.Hu) T.C.Hsu & S.W.Chung - Taiwan
Neottia microglottis (Duthie) Schltr. - western Himalayas
Neottia microphylla (S.C.Chen & Y.B.Luo) S.C.Chen, S.W.Gale & P.J.Cribb - Yunnan
Neottia morrisonicola (Hayata) Szlach. - Taiwan
Neottia mucronata (Panigrahi & J.J.Wood) Szlach. - China, Japan, Korea, eastern Himalayas
Neottia nanchuanica (S.C.Chen) Szlach. - Chongqing
Neottia nandadeviensis (Hajra) Szlach. - Uttarakhand
Neottia nankomontana (Fukuy.) Szlach. - Taiwan
Neottia nepalensis (N.P.Balakr.) Szlach - Nepal
 Neottia nidus-avis (L.) Rich. – widespread across most of Europe; also Algeria, Morocco, Turkey, Iran, Caucasus, western Siberia - bird's-nest orchid
Neottia nipponica (Makino) Szlach. - Russian Far East, Korea, Japan
Neottia oblata (S.C.Chen) Szlach. - Chongqing
 Neottia ovata (L.) Bluff & Fingerh. - Europe, Siberia, Central Asia, Southwestern Asia – common twayblade, eggleaf twayblade
Neottia pantlingii (W.W.Sm.) Tang & F.T.Wang - eastern Himalayas
Neottia papilligera Schltr. - Japan, Korea, Russian Far East, northeastern China
Neottia pinetorum (Lindl.) Szlach. - Himalayas of India, Nepal, China, etc.
Neottia pseudonipponica (Fukuy.) Szlach. - Taiwan
Neottia puberula (Maxim.) Szlach. - China, Japan, Korea, Siberia, Russian Far East
 Neottia smallii (Wiegand) Szlach. – Appalachian Mountains of eastern US - kidneyleaf twayblade
Neottia smithiana Schltr. - Sichuan, Shaanxi
Neottia smithii (Schltr.) Szlach. - Sichuan
Neottia suzukii (Masam.) Szlach. - Taiwan
Neottia taibaishanensis P.H.Yang & K.Y.Lang - Shaanxi
Neottia taizanensis (Fukuy.) Szlach. - Taiwan
Neottia tenii Schltr. - Yunnan
Neottia tenuis (Lindl.) Szlach. - Tibet, Nepal, eastern Himalayas
Neottia tianschanica (Grubov) Szlach. - Xinjiang
Neottia unguiculata (W.W.Sm.) Szlach. - Myanmar
Neottia ussuriensis (Kom. & Nevski) Soó - Primorye region of Russia
Neottia × veltmanii (Case) Baumbach - Michigan  (N. auriculata × N. convallarioides)
Neottia wardii (Rolfe) Szlach. - China, Tibet
Neottia yunnanensis (S.C.Chen) Szlach. - Yunnan

References

External links 

Jepson Manual Treatment (former Listera only)

 
Neottieae genera
Myco-heterotrophic orchids